Niamh Kelly (born 30 August 1995) is a gaelic football player who plays for Mayo and an Australian rules footballer who plays for Adelaide in the AFL Women's (AFLW). She has previously played for West Coast. She is the sister of St Kilda player Grace Kelly.

AFLW career
In June 2019, Kelly joined West Coast as an international rookie, together with her sister Grace Kelly.

Personal life
Kelly is the sister of St Kilda player Grace Kelly.

References

External links

 

Living people
1995 births
Mayo inter-county ladies' footballers
West Coast Eagles (AFLW) players
Irish female players of Australian rules football
Ladies' Gaelic footballers who switched code
Irish expatriate sportspeople in Australia